The Jester's Supper (Italian:La cena delle beffe) is a historical play by the Italian writer Sem Benelli, which was first staged in 1909. In 1919 the play was put on in New York City, under the name The Jest, at Broadway's Plymouth Theatre. It portrays a violent and cruel rivalry in the Florence of Lorenzo the Magnificent.

Adaptations

Opera
The play was the basis for an opera La cena delle beffe composed by Umberto Giordano with a libretto written by Benelli himself. It premiered at La Scala on 20 December 1924.

Film
In 1942 the play was adapted as a film, The Jester's Supper, directed by Alessandro Blasetti and starring Amedeo Nazzari and Osvaldo Valenti. It was made at Cinecittà in Rome. The film was a popular success.

References

Bibliography
Gundle, Stephen. Mussolini's Dream Factory: Film Stardom in Fascist Italy. Berghahn Books, 2013.
 Sassoon, Donald. Culture of the Europeans: From 1800 to the Present. Harper Press, 2006.

1909 plays
Italian plays adapted into films
Plays set in Italy
Plays set in the 15th century
Plays by Sem Benelli
Plays adapted into operas